Trehafod railway station is a railway station serving the township of Trehafod in Rhondda Cynon Taf, Wales. It is located on the Rhondda Line.

It was first opened on this site by the Taff Vale Railway in 1892.

History

The first station was opened by the Taff Vale Railway on 30 August 1861, and was originally named Havod. The Welsh spelling Hafod was adopted in November 1890. It was resited in 1892, and altered to Trehafod on 1 January 1905.

On 18 July 1889, the Barry Railway opened their main line between Hafod Junction and their new docks at Barry and immediately began carrying coal from the Rhondda pits along the new line.

Services
Monday-Saturday, there is a half-hourly daytime service to  southbound and to  northbound, dropping to hourly in the evening. On 20 July 2018, previous franchise operator Arriva Trains Wales announced a trial period of extra Sunday services on the Rhondda Line to Cardiff and Barry Island. This was in response to a survey by Leanne Wood and the success of extra Sunday services on the Merthyr Line and the Rhymney Line.

References

External links

Railway stations in Rhondda Cynon Taf
DfT Category F2 stations
Former Taff Vale Railway stations
Railway stations in Great Britain opened in 1861
Railway stations served by Transport for Wales Rail
1861 establishments in Wales